Wanshishizhudi, born Tan, was the son of Huxie Shizhu Houti. He succeeded Shizi in 98 AD and ruled until 124 AD. He was succeeded by his brother Wujihoushizhudi.

In 107 AD, the Great Qiang Rebellion in conjunction with invasions by the Wuhuan and Xianbei severely weakened the Han dynasty. In 109 AD, the Han renegade Han Zong convinced Wanshi to rebel. Wanshi attacked the Emissary Geng Chong but failed to oust him. Han forces under Geng Kui retaliated and defeated a force of 3,000 Xiongnu but could not take the Southern Xiongnu capital due to disease among the horses of their Xianbei allies. In the following year, the Southern Xiongnu raided Changshan Commandery and Zhongshan Commandery. Wanshi engaged in battle with a Han army of 8,000 under Liang Qin. The Xiongnu surrounded the Han army, but Liang Qin broke through the encirclement, killing 3,000 and defeating the Xiongnu forces. Wanshi surrendered and was given amnesty. Southern Xiongnu troops fought as auxiliaries for the Han army in their conflicts with the Qiang and Xianbei in the following decade.

By the time of Wanshi's death in 124 AD, the Southern Xiongnu state was clearly in decline. He was succeeded by his brother Wujihoushizhudi.

Footnotes

References

Bichurin N.Ya., "Collection of information on peoples in Central Asia in ancient times", vol. 1, Sankt Petersburg, 1851, reprint Moscow-Leningrad, 1950

Taskin B.S., "Materials on Sünnu history", Science, Moscow, 1968, p. 31 (In Russian)

Chanyus